Deep Blue versus Garry Kasparov was a pair of six-game chess matches between then-world chess champion Garry Kasparov and an IBM supercomputer called Deep Blue.  Kasparov won the first match, held in Philadelphia in 1996, by 4-2. Deep Blue won a 1997 rematch held in New York City by 3½–2½. The second match was the first defeat of a reigning world chess champion by a computer under tournament conditions, and was the subject of a documentary film, Game Over: Kasparov and the Machine.

Impact and symbolic significance
The 1997 match was widely covered by the media, and Deep Blue became a celebrity.  After the match, it was reported that IBM had dismantled Deep Blue, but in fact it remained in operation for several years.

Deep Blue's win was seen as symbolically significant, a sign that artificial intelligence was catching up to human intelligence, and could defeat one of humanity's great intellectual champions. Later analysis tended to play down Kasparov's loss as a result of uncharacteristically bad play on Kasparov's part, and play down the intellectual value of chess as a game that can be defeated by brute force.

In December 2016, discussing the match in a podcast with Sam Harris, Kasparov advised of a change of heart in his views of this match. Kasparov stated: "While writing the book I did a lot of research – analysing the games with modern computers, also soul-searching – and I changed my conclusions. I am not writing any love letters to IBM, but my respect for the Deep Blue team went up, and my opinion of my own play, and Deep Blue's play, went down. Today you can buy a chess engine for your laptop that will beat Deep Blue quite easily."

Deep Blue's victory switched the canonical example of a game where humans outmatched machines to the ancient Chinese game of Go, a game of simple rules and far more possible moves than chess, which requires more intuition and is far less susceptible to brute force. Go is widely played in China, South Korea, and Japan, and was considered one of the four arts of the Chinese scholar in antiquity. Go programs were able to defeat only amateur players until Google DeepMind's AlphaGo program defeated the European Go champion Fan Hui in 2015 and then surprisingly defeated top-ranked Lee Sedol in the match AlphaGo versus Lee Sedol in 2016. While Deep Blue mainly relied on brute computational force to evaluate millions of positions, AlphaGo also relied on neural networks and reinforcement learning.

Summary

1996 match

Game 1 

February 10. The first game began with the Sicilian Defence, Alapin Variation. The first game of the 1996 match was the first game to be won by a chess-playing computer against a reigning world champion under normal chess tournament conditions, and in particular,  time controls.

Game 2 

February 11. The second game transposed to an  line of the Catalan Opening. Kasparov played in what could be called a preemptive style, blocking all Deep Blue's  attempts. The game lasted for 73 moves but eventually Deep Blue's operator had to resign the game for the computer in a position where both players had a bishop but Kasparov had three pawns to Deep Blue's one.

Game 3 
February 13. As in the first game, Kasparov played the Sicilian Defence to which Deep Blue again responded with the Alapin Variation. The game lasted for 39 moves and was drawn.

Game 4 
February 14. The fourth game was the second to end in a draw, although at one point Deep Blue's team declined Kasparov's draw offer. The opening transposed to a line of the Queen's Gambit Declined.

Game 5 
February 16. The fifth game was the turning point of the match. Its opening transposed to the Scotch Four Knights Game, an opening combining the characteristics of the Scotch Game and the Four Knights Game.  Game 5 was considered an embarrassment for the Deep Blue team because they had declined Kasparov's draw offer after the 23rd move. This was the only game in the match that Black won.

Game 6 

February 17. The sixth game, like the fourth, transposed to the same line of the Queen's Gambit Declined. The final game was an illustration of just how badly chess engines could play in some positions at the time. Employing anti-computer tactics and keeping the focus of the game on long-term planning, Kasparov slowly improved his position throughout the mid-game while Deep Blue wasted time doing very little to improve its position. By the end of the game, Deep Blue's pieces were crammed into its queenside corner, with no moves to make aside from shuffling its king. Kasparov had all the time in the world to finish the rout. Kasparov's next move would probably have been 44.Qe7 to exchange the queens. That would have allowed his pawn, which was about to promote, to advance.

1997 rematch

Game 1 
May 3. The 1997 rematch began with a line of the Réti Opening which later developed into the King's Indian Attack.  Kasparov won the game in 45 moves.

Deep Blue's 44th move in this game was allegedly the result of a bug in which Deep Blue, unable to determine a desirable move, resorted to a fail-safe.

Game 2 

May 4. The second game began with the Ruy Lopez opening, Smyslov Variation. Kasparov eventually resigned, although post-game analysis indicates that he could have held a draw in the final position. After this game Kasparov accused IBM of cheating, by alleging that a grandmaster (presumably a top rival) had been behind a certain move. The claim was repeated in the documentary Game Over: Kasparov and the Machine. 

At the time it was reported that Kasparov missed the fact that after 45...Qe3 46.Qxd6 Re8, Black (Kasparov) can force a draw by perpetual check. His friends told him so the next morning. They suggested 47.h4 h5, a position after which the black queen can perpetually check White. This is possible as Deep Blue moved 44.Kf1 instead of an alternate move of its king. Regarding the end of game 2 and 44.Kf1 in particular, chess journalist Mig Greengard in the Game Over film states, "It turns out, that the position in, here at the end is actually a draw, and that, one of Deep Blue's final moves was a terrible error, because Deep Blue has two choices here. It can move its king here or move its king over here. It picked the wrong place to step." Another person in that film, four-time US champion Yasser Seirawan, then concludes that "The computer had left its king a little un-defended. And Garry could have threatened a perpetual check, not a win but a perpetual check."

The moves that surprised Kasparov enough to allege cheating were 36.axb5! axb5 37.Be4! after which Black is lost. A more  machine could have won two pawns with 36.Qb6 Rd8 37.axb5 Rab8 38.Qxa6, but after 38...e4! Black would have acquired strong . Deep Blue could have also won material with the move 37.Qb6.  Kasparov and many others thought the move 37.Be4! ignored material gain by force and was too sophisticated for a computer, suggesting there had been some sort of human intervention during the game.

Game 3 
May 6. In the third game, Kasparov chose to employ the irregular 1.d3, the Mieses Opening.  The game then transposed to a line of the English Opening. Kasparov believed that by playing an esoteric opening, the computer would get out of its opening book and play the opening worse than it would have done using the book. Although this is nowadays a common tactic, it was a relatively new idea at the time. Despite this anti-computer tactic, the game was drawn.

Game 4 
May 7. The fourth game began with the initial moves defining the Caro–Kann Defence (1.e4 c6); however, the opening then transposed to the Pirc Defense. Kasparov got into time trouble late in the game.  The sub-optimal moves he played in a hurry may have cost him victory. The game ended with a draw.

Game 5 

May 10. The fifth game of the rematch began identically with the first, with a line of the Réti Opening developing into the King's Indian Attack.  As in the fourth game, Deep Blue played a brilliant endgame that secured a draw, when it was looking as if Kasparov would win. It was later discovered that Kasparov had a win beginning with 44.Rg7+.

If White plays 50.g8=Q, then Black can force a draw by threefold repetition, starting with 50...Rd1+ and then 51...Rd2+.

Game 6 

May 11. Before the sixth game, the overall score was even: 2½–2½. As in game 4, Kasparov played the Caro–Kann Defence. Deep Blue made a knight sacrifice which wrecked Kasparov's defense and forced him to resign in less than twenty moves. As Kasparov later recounts, he chose to play a dubious opening in an effort to put Deep Blue out of its comfort zone. Although the knight sacrifice is a well-known refutation, Kasparov reasoned that an engine wouldn't play the move without a concrete gain.

See also
 AlphaGo versus Lee Sedol
 Arimaa – Kasparov's loss to Deep Blue inspired the creation of a new game designed to be difficult for computers, yet playable with a chess set.
 List of chess games

References

Major sources

Further reading

Chess competitions
Computer chess
Chess in the United States
1996 in chess
1997 in chess
Chess rivalries
History of chess
1996 in sports in Pennsylvania
1997 in New York City
1996 in American sports
1997 in American sports
IBM
Human versus computer matches
1996 in computing
1997 in computing
Sports in Philadelphia
Sports competitions in New York City
Garry Kasparov